Marc Rosset was the defending champion, but lost in the second round to Renzo Furlan.

Yevgeny Kafelnikov won in the final 5–7, 6–1, 6–2, against Cédric Pioline.

Seeds

  Goran Ivanišević (first round)
  Stefan Edberg (second round)
  Michael Chang (quarterfinals)
  Todd Martin (quarterfinals)
  Yevgeny Kafelnikov (champion)
  Cédric Pioline (final)
  Marc Rosset (second round)
  Arnaud Boetsch (first round)

Draw

Finals

Top half

Bottom half

References

External links
 ITF tournament edition details

Singles